The bifluoride ion is an inorganic anion with the chemical formula . The anion is colorless. Salts of bifluoride are commonly encountered in the reactions of fluoride salts with hydrofluoric acid. The commercial production of fluorine involves electrolysis of bifluoride salts.

Structure and bonding
The bifluoride ion has a linear, centrosymmetric structure (D∞h symmetry), with an F−H bond length of 114 pm. The bond strength is estimated to be greater than 155 kJ/mol. In molecular orbital theory, the atoms are modeled to be held together by a 3-center 4-electron bond.

Reactions
Salts, such as potassium bifluoride and ammonium bifluoride are produced by treating fluoride salts with hydrofluoric acid:
, where  =  or 
Potassium bifluoride binds a second equivalent of HF:

Heating these salts releases anhydrous HF.

References

Anions
Fluorides
Bifluorides